The Road is a 2001 Kazakhstani drama film directed by Darezhan Omirbaev. It was screened in the Un Certain Regard section at the 2001 Cannes Film Festival.

Cast
 Jamshed Usmonov - Amir Kobessov
 Saule Toktybayeva - Amir's mother
 Alnur Turgambayeva - Amir's wife
 Magjane Omirbayev - Amir's son / Amir as a child
 Valeria Gouliaeva - Veronika, the waitress
 Valeri Skoribov - Censorship agent
 Moukhamedjane Alpisbaev - Amir's school friend
 Serik Aprimov - The avenging brother

References

External links

2001 films
Kazakh-language films
2001 drama films
Films directed by Darezhan Omirbaev
Kazakhstani drama films